Xanthoconium montanum is a species of bolete fungus in the genus Xanthoconium. Described as new to science in 1987, it is found in North Carolina, where it grows on sandy soil under Pinus strobus, Tsuga canadensis, and Rhododendron maximum. The specific epithet montanum refers to the location of the type collection, in the mountains of southwestern North Carolina.

See also
List of North American boletes

References

External links

Boletaceae
Fungi described in 1987
Fungi of the United States
Fungi without expected TNC conservation status